The GE 25-ton switcher (also known as a 25-tonner) is a model of diesel-electric switcher locomotive that was produced by GE Transportation at their Erie, Pennsylvania, facility between 1941 and 1974. Most examples were produced for industrial customers or the United States Armed Forces, although a number of examples were purchased by freight railroads as well. The majority of production was for customers in the United States and Canada, but export models were produced for buyers on five continents. Production totaled approximately 550 units over 33 years, making it one of the most widely produced switchers in American history.

The small size, low top speed (20 mph or 32 km/h) and low power output (150 hp or 110 kW) of the locomotive made it unsuitable for much beyond switching duties. GE specifically marketed the locomotive as an industrial switcher with a low cost. Many 25-tonners operated for decades, and into the 21st century. A number have been preserved at museums, where some continue to perform switching duties.

Design and production

Design 
The 25-ton switcher was designed primarily for switching duties (moving railroad cars to and from loading/unloading facilities, as well as making up and breaking down trains), with both low power output and low top speed for a locomotive. While not very capable of hauling mainline trains, these features made it cheaper than most other locomotives. For rail-served industries, military installations, and other customers who only needed locomotives for switching and could rely on railroad companies to haul their trains elsewhere, this made it an attractive purchase, and GE specifically marketed the locomotive towards such customers. GE claimed in advertising that the locomotive could reduce the time needed to switch cars by 50 percent, with an availability rating of 97.7 percent – figures which far exceeded those of maintenance-heavy steam locomotives. The 25-tonner's small size also allowed it to fit in places where larger locomotives could not, an asset in industrial facilities and yards where clearances were often low.

The locomotive was designed as a hood unit to improve visibility for the engineer, essential for switching duties. Power was generated using a 6 cylinder Cummins HBI-600 diesel engine producing 150 hp (110 kW) at 1,800 rpm. This engine powered a single GE GT-1503 main generator, which in turn provided electricity to the single rear-mounted GE-733 traction motor which powered the rear axle. Power was provided to the forward axle using a chain drive. The unusual chain drive system for a locomotive was part of the reason for its top speed being limited to 20 mph (32 km/h).

Some 25-tonners were built to meter-gauge and exported to Brazil.

Production 
Throughout the long history of the locomotive's production, minor changes were made to its shape and the location of features such as the bell, exhaust pipe, and lights. Otherwise, the fundamental design was largely unchanged throughout the entirety of the locomotive's 33 year production history. Towards the end of production, GE added an independent axle suspension to new 25-tonners, a feature shared with the GE 35-ton switcher. Many customers made modifications to their 25-tonners after purchase, ranging from minor changes such as moving the bell to completely replacing the prime mover and adding an independent brake.

When the final example was produced in 1974, production totaled approximately 550 locomotives, making the design one of GE's most built locomotive models. While the majority of production was for customers in the United States or Canada, 25-tonners were built for customers in North and South America, Europe, Asia, and Africa.

Operating history 

25-ton switchers were for many years a very common site at rail-served industries in need of small, cheap locomotives capable of switching cars around the many sidings found on their properties. Some examples of users include grain elevators, U.S. military facilities, steel mills, and commuter railroads.

The 25-tonners have been nicknamed "critters" by operators and railfans alike, due to their small size. This nickname is shared with similar GE products such as the closely related 23-ton switcher.

Starting in the 1970s, most 25-ton switchers were gradually replaced, either by more powerful and modern switcher locomotives, or by railcar movers. Many railcar movers can also travel on roads for additional flexibility, unlike the 25-tonner. A number of 25-tonners continued to operate into the 21st century, a testament to their durability. Some have found a second life at railroad museums, where they are used to move equipment.

Modeling 
PIKO manufactures a G scale model of the 25-tonner. Manufacturer Grandt Line also produces 25-tonner models in HO scale.

Preservation 

A number of 25-tonners have been preserved at museums, and some have been restored to operating condition.
The Oklahoma Railway Museum owns former MKT #400, which is undergoing restoration to operating condition.
The Railroad Museum of Long Island owns former Long Island Rail Road #399, which is in operating condition and has been cosmetically restored.
Golden Spike National Historical Park uses a 25-tonner to move its replicas of Jupiter and Union Pacific No. 119 when they are not under their own power.
The Nevada Southern Railroad Museum owns locomotive L-2, which served at the Nevada Test Site during the 1960s.
The Phillipsburg Railroad Historians own a 25-tonner which previously served at an Alstom plant in Easton, PA.
The C.P.R. Station Heritage Park and Interpretive Centre in Portage la Prairie has a 25-tonner on display, formerly of Manitoba Hydro.
The Steam Railroading Institute owns a 25-tonner nicknamed "Mighty Mouse" that is in operating condition, formerly operated at a grain elevator.
The Illinois Railway Museum owns a 1942-vintage 25-tonner in operating condition that worked at cement plants for 78 years prior to being donated to the museum in 2020.
Central Texas Gravel Locomotive No. 210 is preserved at the Arkansas Railroad Museum and is listed on the National Register of Historic Places. The museum also owns a former Wabash Alloys locomotive, which is also listed on the NRHP.
The Pennsylvania Trolley Museum owns operable 25-tonner No. 89 which has been converted to  Pennsylvania Trolley Gauge.
The Niagara Railway Museum in Fort Erie, Ontario owns an operational 25-tonner built in 1948.
The Seashore Trolley Museum acquired ex-Providence and Worcester Railroad No. 150 in 2020; the unit was built in late 1945. The locomotive sees active use switching various locations on the museum's property.

See also 

 GE 44-ton switcher
 GE 45-ton switcher
 List of GE locomotives

References 

General Electric locomotives
Diesel-electric locomotives of the United States
Railway locomotives introduced in 1941
Shunting locomotives